(William) Henry Gore-Langton (1802 – 16 May 1875), was a British Liberal Party politician.

Background
Gore-Langton was a younger son of William Gore-Langton by his second wife Mary, daughter of John Browne.

Political career
Gore-Langton was Mayor of Bristol in 1851 and sat as a Member of Parliament (MP) for Bristol between 1852 and 1865.

Family
Gore-Langton married firstly Maria, daughter of John Lewis, in 1824. They had two sons, William Frederick (born 1839) and Edward Albert (born 1842). After Maria's death in 1864 he married secondly Mary Ann, daughter of William Williams, in 1865. He died in May 1875.

References

Sources

External links 
 

1802 births
1875 deaths
Liberal Party (UK) MPs for English constituencies
UK MPs 1852–1857
UK MPs 1857–1859
UK MPs 1859–1865
Mayors of Bristol
Henry